Patissa atrilinealis is a moth in the family Crambidae. It was described by George Hampson in 1919. It is found in Kenya.

See also 
 List of moths of Kenya

References

Endemic moths of Kenya
Moths described in 1919
Schoenobiinae